The Trump administration proposed a number of nominees to appointed positions who were rejected by the Senate or withdrew voluntarily.

Executive Office of the President

Department of Agriculture

Department of Commerce

Department of Defense

Department of Education

Department of Energy

Department of Health and Human Services

Department of Homeland Security

Department of the Interior

Department of Justice

Department of Labor

Department of State

Department of Transportation

Department of the Treasury

Department of Veterans Affairs

Central Intelligence Agency

Environmental Protection Agency

Office of the Director of National Intelligence

Independent agencies

Federal judges

See also
List of Trump administration dismissals and resignations
List of short-tenure Donald Trump political appointments

References 

Donald Trump
nominees